He-Ḥalutz was a Hebrew magazine which appeared irregularly between 1852 and 1889.

Abraham Geiger, Abraham Krochmal, Isaac Samuel Reggio, Mordecai Dubs, and Moritz Steinschneider were among the contributors to the earlier volumes, the major portion of which, however, was written by the editor. The articles in the later volumes were written by Schorr exclusively.

He-Ḥalutz was the most radical of maskilic periodical publications, and Schorr's attacks on the great rabbinical authorities, and even on the Talmud, aroused intense opposition. Entire works, like Moshe Aryeh Leib Harmolin's Ha-Ḥoletz (Lemberg, 1861) and Meir Kohn Bistritz's Bi'ur tit ha-yavan (Presburg, 1888), were written to refute its statements.

References

External links
 Online editions at HathiTrust

1852 establishments in the Austrian Empire
1889 disestablishments in Europe
Haskalah
Hebrew-language newspapers